Tāranātha (1575–1634) was a Lama of the Jonang school of Tibetan Buddhism. He is widely considered its most remarkable scholar and exponent.

Taranatha was born in Tibet, supposedly on the birthday of Padmasambhava. His original name was Kun-dga'-snying-po, the Sanskrit equivalent of which is Anandagarbha. However, he adopted Taranatha, the Sanskrit name by which he was generally known, as an indication of the value he placed on his Sanskrit scholarship in an era when mastery of the language had become much less common in Tibet than it had once been. He was also paying homage to his Indian teacher, Buddhaguptanatha.

His exceptional qualities are said to have been recognized by others at a young age, as is often the case with great masters. He studied under such masters as Je Draktopa, Yeshe Wangpo, Kunga Tashi and Jampa Lhundrup, although his primary teacher was Buddhaguptanatha.

Taranatha was recognized by Khenchen Lungrik Gyatso as the rebirth of Krishnacarya and the Khenchen's own teacher, Jetsun Kunga Drolchok.

Works
Taranatha was a prolific writer and a renowned scholar. His best known work is the 143-folio History of Buddhism in India (dpal dus kyi 'khor lo'i chos bskor gyi byung khungs nyer mkho) of 1608, which has been published in English. Other works are The Golden Rosary, Origins of the Tantra of the Bodhisattva Tara of 1604 which has also been translated into English. He was an advocate of the Shentong view of emptiness and wrote many texts and commentaries on this subject. English-language translation publications of his works on Shentong are The Essence of Other-Emptiness (which includes a translation of his Twenty One Profound Meanings (Zab don gсer gcig pa)) and his Commentary on the Heart Sutra.
In 1614 Taranatha founded the important Jonangpa monastery Takten Dhamchöling, in the Tsangpo Valley about 200 miles west of Lhasa.

Later life 
Probably not long after 1614, Taranatha went to Mongolia, where he reportedly founded several monasteries. He died probably in Urga. His rebirth became known as Zanabazar, the 1st Bogd Gegeen and Jebtsundamba Khutuktu of Mongolia. His most recent reincarnation was the 9th Jebtsundamba Khutughtu, who died in 2012.

See also
Jonang
Shentong
Kalachakra
Dolpopa Sherab Gyaltsen

References

Sources
 Taranatha (auth.), Hopkins, Jeffrey (trans). The Essence of Other-Emptiness Snow Lion(2007).  
Stearns, Cyrus. The Buddha from Dolpo: A Study of the Life and Thought of the Tibetan Master Dolpopa Sherab Gyaltsen. State University of New York Press (1999).  (hc);  (pbk).  -(contains fairly extensive information on Taranatha)

Further reading
 Tharanatha; Chattopadhyaya, Chimpa, Alaka, trans. (2000). History of Buddhism in India, Motilal Books UK,  .
 Tāranātha's Edelsteinmine, das Buch von den Vermittlern der sieben Inspirationen / aus dem Tibetischen übers. von Albert Grünwedel. - Petrograd: Imprimerie de l'Académie Impériale des Sciences, 1914 PDF 
 Tāranātha's Geschichte des Buddhismus in Indien. Aus dem Tibetischen übersetzt von Anton Schiefner. St. Petersburg: Kais. Akademie der Wissenschaften 1869. XII.  St. Petersburg 1869. PDF
 Tāranātha-‘Dzam-Thang-edition-complete-23-volumes 
 Tāranātha-Ladakh-edition-complete-17-volumes 
 Tāranātha-pe-cin-edition-complete-45-volumes

External links
The Life of Zanabazar
The Jonang Foundation on Taranatha
The Jonang Dharma on Taranatha

Scholars of Buddhism from Tibet
Lamas from Tibet
Jonang lamas
16th-century lamas
1575 births
1634 deaths
Tibetan Buddhism writers
Tibetan philosophers